Kassiaty Gildas Aymard Labi (born May 6, 1984 in Abidjan) is an Ivorian football player.

Career
Labi began his career in 2001 with Africa Sports as midfielder until 2006 and wore the club number 12. The former Africa Captain signed in 2007 for ASEC Mimosas as midfielder wearing club number 8. In January 2009 he left ASEC Mimosas before signing, in May 2009, for Yangon United FC. He played for striker wearing club number 19. In January 2010 he signed for Delta United as a midfielder wearing club number 8 he played in the Myanmar League for about a year and half. After getting a new contract he moved to Thailand and was signed to the first team for league Division 1 in 2011 with Chanthaburi F.C.,  as striker wearing club number 25. Then in 2012 he signed for a new team with Rayong United F.C.,  as striker in league Division 2. In January 2013 he moved to league Division 1 again and signed with Trat F.C. as midfielder wearing club number 23.

References

Ivorian footballers
1984 births
Living people
Expatriate footballers in Myanmar
ASEC Mimosas players
Footballers from Abidjan
Association football midfielders